Andy Geddes (27 October 1959 – 22 March 2022) was a Scottish footballer, who played for Dundee in the Scottish Football League and Wits University in South Africa. He was born in Paisley.

Andy on 16 March 2022 died following a battle with cancer.

References

External links 

1959 births
2022 deaths
Footballers from Paisley, Renfrewshire
Association football forwards
Scottish footballers
Leicester City F.C. players
Dundee F.C. players
Scottish Football League players
Bidvest Wits F.C. players